Sardinian towns

This is a list of selected cities in Sardinia with local names.

Metropolitan areas 
Cagliari, (population about 450,000)
Including Quartu Sant'Elena, Selargius, Assemini, Capoterra, Monserrato, Sestu, Sinnai, Quartucciu, Maracalagonis and Elmas.

 Provincial administrative capitals 
Cagliari, Casteddu (population about 160,000)
Carbonia
Nuoro, NùgoroOristano, AristanisSassari (population about 130,000)

 Other towns and villages 
Alghero, L'AlguerArzachena, AlzachenaBitti, VithiBonorva, BonòlvaBosa
Castelsardo, CalthedduCuglieri, CuliriDorgali, DurgaliFlumini Maggiore, Frùmini MajoriGavoi, GaboiGuspini, GùspiniIglesias, IgrèsiasLa Maddalena, MadalenaLanusei, LanusèiMacomer, MacumereMogoro, MogoruMamoiada, MamujadaOlbia, Terranòa/TarranòaOliena, UlianaOrune, OrùneOzieri, OthieriPerfugas, PeifugasPloaghe, PiaghePorto Torres, PosthudorraPosada, PasadaPozzomaggiore, PuthumajorePula
Quartu Sant'Elena, Quartu Sant'AleniSan Teodoro, Santu DiadoruSanluri, SeddoriSant'Antioco, Sant'AntioguSanta Teresa Gallura, LungoniSelargius, CedraxiusSiniscola, ThiniscoleTempio Pausania, TèmpiuTerralba, TarrabaTeulada
Tortolì, TortuelieUrzulei, OrthullèVillaputzu, BiddeputziVillacidro, BiddexidruSee also
Sardinia
Tourist destinations of Sardinia
Sardinian Archaeological and artistic sites

Further reading
 Ong, Brenda Man Qing, and Francesco Perono Cacciafoco. (2022). Unveiling the Enigmatic Origins of Sardinian Toponyms. Languages'', 7, 2, 131: 1–19, Paper, DOI: https://doi.org/10.3390/languages7020131.

 
Sardinia
Cities